A demarcation dispute is a dispute between (usually) two trades unions as to whose members should do a particular job, and is associated with multi-unionism in an enterprise, where two labour unions claim the right to represent the same class or group of workers. This is particularly important in compulsory arbitration systems of industrial relations, as in Australia; where only one union may be the registered representative of a particular classification of worker.

The term is also applied to disputes in assigning credit for significant discoveries in science, in particular the recognition of such credit by major awards such as the Nobel Prize. Notable Nobel Prize controversies include the 1962 Nobel Prize in Physiology or Medicine, awarded to James D. Watson, Francis H. C. Crick, and Maurice Wilkins for their discovery of the structure of deoxyribonucleic acid (DNA). It has been argued that the award failed to give appropriate credit to Rosalind Franklin for her X-ray crystallography on the DNA molecule, whose evidence is acknowledged to have been critical to the discovery. It is acknowledged in this case that the Nobel Prize may not be shared among more than three persons, and is not given to deceased persons (Franklin had died in 1958). 

A second notable example is the 1974 Nobel Prize in Physics, awarded to Antony Hewish and Martin Ryle but not to Jocelyn Bell Burnell. Bell, as a doctoral student under the direction of Hewish, made the primary observations that lead to recognition of the phenomenon of pulsars. Burnell herself has stated "[I]t would demean Nobel Prizes if they were awarded to research students, except in very exceptional cases ....". 

With respect to demarcation disputes involving Nobel Prize awards, it is notable that the importance placed by selection committees on a body of work over many years, rather than a single experiment or observation.

Trade unions